Anguloa, commonly known as tulip orchids, is a small orchid genus closely related to Lycaste. Its abbreviation in horticulture is Ang. This genus was described by José Antonio Pavón and Hipólito Ruiz López in 1798. They named it in honor of Francisco de Angulo, Director-General of Mines of Spain.

This genus is found on the forest floor at high elevations from Venezuela, Colombia, Ecuador, Bolivia and Peru.

Description 

Tulip orchids are rather large terrestrial and sometimes epiphytic plants with fleshy pseudobulbs longer than 20 cm. The long, lanceolate and plicate leaves of a full-grown Anguloa can be more than 1 m long. Two to four leaves grow from the base of each pseudobulb. The leaves are deciduous, and are shed at the start of each new growth.

The flowers of these orchids have a strong scent of cinnamon. They are of waxy appearance and are (in wild species) either of two colors, depending on the species – greenish white, or yellow to red. A single flower per inflorescence arises from the base of each new pseudobulb. The white tulip orchids have six inflorescences per pseudobulb, the other can produce up to twelve inflorescences. The sepals have a bulbous shape, resembling a tulip; hence the common name. The lip is three-lobed. The column has four pollinia.

Species 
There are 13 species of tulip orchids, including 4 apparently of hybrid origin though established in the wild.  Other hybrid tulip orchids are bred by horticulturalists, but do not occur in the wild. The following are currently accepted as of May 2014:

References

External links 
 
 
 Anguloa photo gallery

 
Maxillariinae genera
Epiphytic orchids
Orchids of Bolivia
Orchids of Peru
Orchids of Ecuador
Orchids of Colombia
Orchids of Venezuela